Houtaing is a village and district of the municipality of Ath, located in the Hainaut Province in Wallonia, Belgium.

The earliest mention of the village is in a document dated 847, listing properties of the Saint-Amand Abbey in present-day France. Later it became a feudal fief. The current Château de la Berlière in Houtaing dates from 1793, by architect Antoine Payen the Elder, and replaced an earlier castle.

References

External links

Populated places in Hainaut (province)